Rafail Evseevich Krichevskii (Рафаил Евсеевич Кричевский, sometimes transliterated as "Krichevskiy" or "Krichevsky", born October 12, 1936, Kharkov) is a Russian mathematician  and information theorist, now living in the United States.

He graduated from Moscow State University in 1958. He received his PhD degree in Theoretical Cybernetics in 1963. His PhD advisor was S.V.Yablonsky.  Further, Krichevskii became a doctor of physical and mathematical sciences (1988) and professor (1991), specializing in the field of mathematical cybernetics and information theory. From 1962 to 1996 he worked at the Sobolev Institute of Mathematics. In the late 90s he worked in University of California, Riverside, US. 

His main publications are in the fields of universal source coding, optimal hashing, combinatorial retrieval and error-correcting codes.

Krichevsky–Trofimov estimator is widely used in source coding and bioinformatics.

He supervised 5 doctoral (Russian candidate degree) students and 2 higher doctoral (habilitation) students. He is the author of about 80 scientific papers.

In 1986 Krichevskii was an Invited Speaker with talk Retrieval and data compression complexity at the ICM in Berkeley, California.

Selected publications
with V.K.Trofimov: "The Performance of Universal Encoding." IEEE Trans. Inform. Theory, V.27:2, (1981) 199–207. doi:10.1109/TIT.1981.1056331
with B. Ya Ryabko and A. Yu Haritonov: "Optimal key for taxons ordered in accordance with their frequencies." Discrete Applied Mathematics 3, no. 1 (1981): 67–72. 
"Optimal hashing." Information and Control, V. 62:1, (1984) 64–92. doi:10.1016/S0019-9958(84)80010-8
"Laplace's law of succession and universal encoding." IEEE Trans.  Inform. Theory, V. 44:1, (1998) 296–303. doi:10.1109/18.651051
"Universal Compression and Retrieval." Kluwer Academic Publishers (1994), 219 p.https://www.springer.com/br/book/9780792326724

References

External links
 
 Mathnet.ru

20th-century Russian mathematicians
Cyberneticists
Moscow State University alumni
1936 births
Living people